Air Commodore K. K. Pumpuni was a Ghanaian air force personnel and served in the Ghana Air Force. He was the Chief of Air Staff of the Ghana Air Force from May 1980 to January 1982.

References

Ghanaian military personnel
Ghana Air Force personnel
Chiefs of Air Staff (Ghana)